The following lists events that happened during 1981 in the Republic of Guatemala.

Incumbents
President: Fernando Romeo Lucas García
Vice President: Óscar Mendoza Azurdia

Events

April
 April 21 - Soldiers of the Army of Guatemala entered the village of Acul, near Santa Maria Nebaj in the Guatemalan highlands, and executed most of the adult men for suspected collaboration with leftist guerillas. "Within two weeks," an investigator for the government noted in 1997, "the village was empty, and the army burned every house and field of corn in Acul". The village was rebuilt two years later.

References

 
Years of the 20th century in Guatemala
Guatemala
Guatemala
1980s in Guatemala